Juloori Gouri Shankar is an Indian writer of Telugu-language works. He is the president of Telangana Rachayatala Vedika. He is the author of Sakala Janula Samme.

References

Living people
Telugu writers
Year of birth missing (living people)